The jugular fossa is a deep depression in the inferior part of the temporal bone at the base of the skull. It lodges the bulb of the internal jugular vein.

Structure 
The jugular fossa is located in the temporal bone, posterior to the carotid canal and the cochlear aqueduct.

In the bony ridge dividing the carotid canal from the jugular fossa is the small inferior tympanic canaliculus for the passage of the tympanic branch of the glossopharyngeal nerve.

In the lateral part of the jugular fossa is the mastoid canaliculus for the entrance of the auricular branch of the vagus nerve.

Behind the jugular fossa is a quadrilateral area, the jugular surface, covered with cartilage in the fresh state, and articulating with the jugular process of the occipital bone.

Variation 
The jugular fossa has variable depth and size in different skulls.

Function 
The jugular fossa lodges the bulb of the internal jugular vein.

Clinical significance 
Abnormally shaped jugular fossae may cause ear problems. If it lies close to the cochlea, it may cause tinnitus. A high jugular fossa may be linked to Ménière's disease.

See also
 Fossa (anatomy)

Additional images

References

External links
 Picture (#32 on third diagram)
 

Bones of the head and neck